Plava Voda (Blue Water) is a large spring, which creates approximately 350 metres long eponymous river, in Travnik, Bosnia and Herzegovina. It rises under Vlašić mountain, just below Travnik Castle, in the centre of Old Town of Travnik.

Geography
The Plava Voda springs out of a large slit at the bottom of a mountainside, which is situated within the narrow depression in Travnik's Old Town (Ćaršija) neighborhood, in the heart of the city. Immediately above the wellspring rises an old Travnik's citadel, the Travnik Castle. The river runs through part of an Old Town Travnik, and after roughly 300 metres it reaches and spills into the Lašva river near the eastern town's gate.

Utilization and protection
Wellspring of Plava Voda is a city's main source of potable water. It is also one of the main attractions of Travnik's rich natural and cultural-historic heritage. Areal around the wellspring, comprising Old Town is declared National Monument of Bosnia and Herzegovina on 26 April 2013.

The Plava Voda runs through part of an Old Town Travnik stacked with cafe-bars and restaurants, popular with both locals and tourists, 

Recently, fear have been growing in Travnik that spring's discharge could be significantly depleted, while natural and cultural ambient of entire areal spoiled, as plans for further development of water utilization have gained political backings at local and state levels.

References

Springs of Bosnia and Herzegovina
Rivers of Bosnia and Herzegovina
Travnik
SPlava voda